Belintersat-1 is a deployed geostationary telecommunications satellite, manufactured by the China Aerospace Science and Technology Corporation (CASC) and Thales Alenia Space for the Belarusian government's company Belintersat.

It provides a wide range of telecommunicational services, including satellite TV and radio broadcasting and broadband internet access. It lifted off on a Chinese Long March CZ-3B/E rocket from Xichang Satellite Launch Center (XSLC) on January 15, 2016, 16:57 GMT.

See also

 2016 in spaceflight

References

External links
 BELINTELSAT 1 Real time tracking

Spacecraft launched in 2016
2016 in Belarus
Satellite television
Communications satellites of Belarus
Spacecraft launched by Long March rockets